Waltham Forest London Borough Council in London is elected every four years. Since the last boundary changes in 2002, 60 councillors have been elected from 20 wards, with 3 councillors per ward.

Political control
The first election to the council was held in 1964, initially operating as a shadow authority ahead of the new system coming into full effect the following year. Political control of the council since 1964 has been held by the following parties:

Leadership
The leaders of the council since 1965 have been:

Council elections

Summary of the council composition after recent council elections, click on the year for full details of each election.

Borough result maps

By-election results

1964-1968
There were no by-elections.

1968-1971

1971-1974

1974-1978

1978-1982

1982-1986

1986-1990

1990-1994

The by-election was called following the resignation of Cllr. Patrick J. Hayes.

1994-1998

The by-election was called following the resignation of Cllr. Neal A. Chubb.

1998-2002

The by-election was called following the resignation of Cllr. Huw M. Morgan-Thomas.

2002-2006

The by-election was called following the death of Cllr. Mohammed F. Rahman.

The by-election was called following the resignation of Cllr. Martin J. O'Connor.

The by-election was called following the resignation of Cllr. David Divine.

The by-election was called following the death of Cllr. Mohammed M. Nasim.

The by-election was called following the resignation of Cllr. Ian Leslie.

2006-2010

The by-election was called following the death of Cllr. Derek B. Arnold.

The by-election was called following the disqualification of Cllr. Miranda A. J. Grell.
*No description (rather than independent). Candidate is a member of the Respect Party and was supported by the local branch. She was unable to use Respect as her description due to a split in the party. Current UK electoral law allows candidates to stand without any description rather than independent if preferred.

The by-election was called following the resignation of Cllr. Imran Abrahim.

The by-election was called following the death of Cllr. John M. Gover.

The by-election was called following the death of Cllr. John D. Beanse and the resignation of Cllr. John N. H. Penstone due to ill health.

The by-election was called following the death of Cllr. John F. Walter.

2010-2014

The by-election was called following the resignation of Cllr. Edwin J. Northover.

2014-2018

The by-election was triggered by the death of Councillor Nadeem Ali, of the Labour Party.

Notes

References

External links
Waltham Forest Council